The takin (Budorcas taxicolor), also called cattle chamois or gnu goat, is a large species of ungulate of the subfamily Caprinae found in the eastern Himalayas. It includes four subspecies: the Mishmi takin (B. t. taxicolor), the golden takin (B. t. bedfordi), the Tibetan (or Sichuan) takin (B. t. tibetana), and the Bhutan takin (B. t. whitei).

Whilst the takin has in the past been placed together with the muskox in the tribe Ovibovini, more recent mitochondrial research shows a closer relationship to Ovis (sheep). Its physical similarity to the muskox is therefore an example of convergent evolution. The takin is the national animal of Bhutan.

Etymology

Appearance
The takin rivals the muskox as the largest and stockiest of the subfamily Caprinae, which includes goats, sheep, and similar species. Its short legs are supported by large, two-toed hooves, which each have a highly developed spur. It has a stocky body and a deep chest. Its large head is distinctive by its long, arched nose and stout horns, which are ridged at the base. Its long, shaggy coat is light in color with a dark stripe along the back, and males (bulls) also have dark faces.

Four subspecies of takin are currently recognised, and these tend to show a variation in coat colour. Their thick wool often turns black in colour on their undersides and legs. Their overall coloration ranges from dark blackish to reddish-brown suffused with grayish-yellow in the eastern Himalayas to lighter yellow-gray in the Sichuan Province to mostly golden or (rarely) creamy-white with fewer black hairs in the Shaanxi Province.

The legend of the 'golden fleece' sought by Jason and the Argonauts may have been inspired by the lustrous coat of the golden takin (B. t. bedfordi).

In height, takin stand  at the shoulder, but measure a relatively short  in head-and-body length, with the tail adding only an additional . Measurements of weights vary, but according to most reports, the males are slightly larger, weighing  against  in females.

Instead of relying on localized scent glands, the takin secretes an oily, strong-smelling substance over its whole body, enabling it to mark objects such as trees. A prominent nose with a swollen appearance caused biologist George Schaller to liken the takin to a "bee-stung moose."  Features reminiscent of familiar domesticated species have earned takins such nicknames as "cattle chamois" and "gnu goat."

Distribution and habitat
The Mishmi takin occurs in eastern Arunachal Pradesh, while the Bhutan takin is in western Arunachal Pradesh and Bhutan. Dihang-Dibang Biosphere Reserve in Arunachal Pradesh, India is a stronghold of both Mishmi, Upper Siang (Kopu) and Bhutan takins.

Behaviour and ecology
Takin are found in small family groups of around 20 individuals, although older males may lead more solitary existences. In the summer, herds of up to 300 individuals gather high on the mountain slopes. Groups often appear to occur in largest numbers when favorable feeding sites, salt licks, or hot springs are located. Mating takes place in July and August. Adult males compete for dominance by sparring head-to-head with opponents, and both sexes appear to use the scent of their own urine to indicate dominance. A single young is born after a gestation period of around eight months. Takin migrate from the upper pasture to lower, more forested areas in winter and favor sunny spots upon sunrise. When disturbed, individuals give a 'cough' alarm call and the herd retreats into thick bamboo thickets and lies on the ground for camouflage.

Takin feed in the early morning and late afternoon, grazing on a variety of leaves and grasses, as well as bamboo shoots and flowers. Salt is also an important part of their diets, and groups may stay at a mineral deposit for several days.

Threats
The takin is listed as Vulnerable on the IUCN Red List and considered Endangered in China. It is threatened by overhunting and the destruction of its natural habitat. It is not a common species naturally, and the population appears to have been reduced considerably. Takin horns have appeared in the illegal wildlife trade in Myanmar; and during three surveys carried out from 1999 to 2006 in the Tachilek market, a total of 89 sets of horns were observed openly for sale.

References

Further reading

External links

 
 Wild creamy-white golden takins (b. t. bedfordi) in China

Caprids
Mammals described in 1850
Taxa named by Brian Houghton Hodgson